"Angles" is a song by American rapper Wale featuring American singer Chris Brown, released on June 18, 2021 through Warner Records as the lead single from Wale's seventh studio album Folarin II.

Background and content
Wale posted on his social media platforms, announcing that the song would've been released at night. OG Parker, one of the main producers for the song, said that the inspiration came from the hip hop track "I Need a Girl": "Wale creates brilliant poems about his feelings for his leading lady, some of which are light-hearted and others which are sadder."

Composition
The song is written in the key of F Minor, with a tempo of 95 beats per minute. The song was produced by $K, Hitmaka, LouXtwo and OG Parker, it was also samples from "I Need a Girl" (2002) by Puff Daddy, Usher and Loon. Wale on the track showcases some of his wordplay: "You saying the universe ain't grateful / I'll put Infinity Stones on all your fingers", displaying his feelings: "Maybe, I got your heart / Maybe I can't love you, 'cause I don't know where to start", while Chris Brown's hook was deemed "reflective" and "sensual": "You know the way to pose, you know, you know your angles / I can't tame you, I can't change you".

Critical reception
Rachel George of ABC Audio commented that the song "is the perfect anthem for any summer song playlist". The Sources reviewer Shawn Grant stated that Brown on the track "once again proves to be the hook king". Ayana Rashed of Revolt praised Wale's "memorable wordplay and quippy pickups" on the track, affirming that Brown's chorus is "sensual" and "essential to the song".

Music video
An accompanying music video was released on June 22, 2021, and directed by Daniel CZ. The characteristic of video is Wale "showering his woman with blue and white flowers, before taking her out for a romantic dinner." Subsequently nearby a pool, Brown and Wale "performing the feel-good tune" in between scenes.

Track listing
Digital download and streaming (Explicit)
"Angles"  – 2:54
Digital download and streaming (Clean)
"Angles" [Clean]  – 2:54
Digital download and streaming (Club Mix)
"Angles" [Club Mix]  – 2:55
Digital download and streaming (Instrumental)
"Angles" [Instrumental]  – 2:55

Credits and personnel
Credits adapted from AllMusic.

 $K – producer
 Wale – composer, primary artist, vocals
 Chris Brown – composer, featured artist, vocals
 Chrishan – composer
 Hitmaka – producer
 LouXtwo – producer
 OG Parker – producer
 Kevin Spencer – mastering engineer, mixing

Charts

Weekly charts

Year-end charts

Release history

References

2021 singles
2021 songs
Wale (rapper) songs
Chris Brown songs
Maybach Music Group singles
Warner Music Group singles
Songs written by Wale (rapper)
Songs written by Chris Brown
Songs written by OG Parker